In Panamanian football, the ANAPROF Apertura 2008 season (officially "Torneo Apertura 2008") started on February 22, 2008. On May 31, 2008, the Apertura 2008 finalized with San Francisco F.C. crowned five time ANAPROF champion after beating Tauro F.C. 3–1.

Changes for Apertura 2008
The league was split into two groups for the regular season with a 4-team playoff after the season was completed. The semifinals are two-leg playoffs, and the final is a single match. The 4 teams qualified for the playoff are decided based in an aggregate table.
Group A is integrated by Atlético Chiriquí, Atletico Veragüense, San Francisco F.C., Plaza Amador and Municipal Chorrillo and Group B is integrated by Tauro F.C., Arabe Unido, Chepo F.C., Sporting San Miguelito and Alianza.
The last team in the general standings will play a playoff against the champion of Primera A instead of facing direct relegation.
The total numbers of games was reduced to 13 game weeks because the Panamanian football federation wanted to end the season as soon as possible in order to have all national team players ready for the 2010 World Cup qualification.

Teams

Standings

Group A

Group B

Results table

Final round

Semifinals 1st Leg (Semifinales - Juego de ida)

Semifinals 2nd Leg (Semifinales - Juego de vuelta)

San Francisco advances to final 3–1 on penalties

Final

Since San Francisco already qualified for 2008–09 CONCACAF Champions League, Tauro also qualified.

Top goalscorers

Goalscorers by team

Local derby statistics

El Super Clasico Nacional - Tauro v Plaza Amador

Clasico del Pueblo - Plaza Amador v Chorillo

Clasico Interiorano - Atlético Chiriquí v Atlético Veragüense

ANAPROF seasons
1
Pan